Located in northeastern Wisconsin, the Oconto River is a tributary of Lake Michigan via Green Bay.

Images

References

Tributaries of Lake Michigan
Rivers of Wisconsin
Rivers of Oconto County, Wisconsin
Rivers of Shawano County, Wisconsin
Rivers of Marinette County, Wisconsin
Rivers of Menominee County, Wisconsin
Rivers of Langlade County, Wisconsin
Rivers of Forest County, Wisconsin